Yak butter (also known as "Dri Butter" or "Su oil") is butter made from the milk of the domestic yak (Bos grunniens). Many herder communities in China, India, Mongolia, Nepal, Gilgit-Baltistan Pakistan and Tibet produce and consume dairy products made from yak's milk, including butter. Whole yak's milk has about twice the fat content of whole cow's milk, producing a butter with a texture closer to cheese. It is a staple food product and trade item for herder communities in south Central Asia and the Tibetan Plateau.

Production
Yaks provide their herders with many different benefits, including dung for fuel, draught power, meat, fiber, and milk. Not all herding communities have a tradition of using yak's milk or making butter, although in regions of mountain pastures the practice is common. Each individual yak cow produces little milk, so only when large herds are present can herders expect much milk to be obtained. Milk is much more plentiful in summer than winter; turning fresh milk into butter or cheese is a way to store calories for later use.

In western Tibet, yak's milk is first allowed to ferment overnight. In summer, the resulting yogurt-like substance is churned for about an hour by plunging a wooden paddle repeatedly into a tall wooden churn. In winter, yogurt is accumulated for several days, then poured into an inflated sheep's stomach and shaken until butter forms.

Fresh yak butter is preserved a number of ways, and can last for up to a year when unexposed to air and stored in cool dry conditions. It is sewn into sheep-stomach bags, wrapped in yak skin, or wrapped in big rhododendron leaves. Once the container is opened, yak butter will begin to decompose; producing veins of blue mold similar to blue cheese.

The English word "yak" is a loan originating from Tibetan: གཡག་, Wylie: g.yak. In Tibetan, it refers only to the male of the species, who needless to say do not produce milk (a literal translation into Tibetan would be like saying "bull butter"); the female are called Tibetan: འབྲི་, Wylie: 'bri, or nak. In English, as in most other languages that have borrowed the word, "yak" is usually used for both sexes.

Uses

Yak butter tea is a daily staple dish throughout the Himalaya region and is usually made with yak butter, tea, salt and water churned into a froth. It is the "Tibetan national beverage" with Tibetans drinking upwards of sixty small cups a day for hydration and nutrition needed in cold high altitudes. Sometimes rancid butter is used, which gives the tea a different taste.

Melted yak butter may be mixed, in roughly equal proportions, with roasted barley flour (tsampa). The resulting dough, mixed with dates or sesame seeds, is used for welcoming guests. It can also be stored for later use and then melted into hot water, to which salt or sugar has been added.

Yak butter is used in traditional tanning of hides. Old, rancid butter is preferred over fresh.

Other non-food uses include fueling yak-butter lamps, moisturizing skin, and the traditional butter sculptures for Tibetan New Year. Such yak-butter sculptures may reach nearly 10 meters in height.

In Nepal, particularly in Kathmandu, yak cheese and yak butter are produced in factories and sold commercially. During 1997–1998, twenty-six tonnes of butter were produced and sold this way in Nepal.

See also

 List of spreads
 List of Tibetan dishes

References

Butter
Chinese cuisine
Tibetan cuisine
Mongolian cuisine
Nepalese cuisine
Bhutanese cuisine
Buryat cuisine
Tuvan cuisine
Kalmyk cuisine
Altai cuisine
Indian cuisine
Central Asian cuisine
Pakistani cuisine
Staple foods
Yaks